The Virginia is a historic apartment / office building located in Richmond, Virginia.  It was built in 1906, and is a five-story, Classical Revival style brick building. The building features limestone, granite, and pressed metal decorative elements. The building originally housed the headquarters of the Virginia State Insurance Company.

It was listed on the National Register of Historic Places in 1983.

References

Commercial buildings on the National Register of Historic Places in Virginia
Residential buildings on the National Register of Historic Places in Virginia
Neoclassical architecture in Virginia
Commercial buildings completed in 1906
Buildings and structures in Richmond, Virginia
National Register of Historic Places in Richmond, Virginia
1906 establishments in Virginia